The Saints Boris and Gleb Cathedral is the main Orthodox church in Daugavpils, Latvia. It can hold 5,000 people, being the biggest Orthodox church in Latvia.

The cathedral is situated in Jaunbūve (Novoye Stroyenie) neighbourhood on the Church hill (Baznīckalns), along with the Immaculate Conception Catholic Church, the Martin Luther Lutheran Cathedral, and the House of Prayer of Daugavpils First Old Believers' Community.

History 

A previous church on the site was built in 1866 by the order of the Governor-General of the Northwestern Krai Konstantin von Kaufman for the needs of the local garrison and was consecrated in honour of the emperor Constantine I and his mother Helena. Usually referred to as the Iron church (Железная церковь, Dzelzs baznīca) because of its external cladding, it was dismantled and rebuilt at Tsargrad (now Jersika), where it still remains, following the decision to build a new garrison cathedral at the original site.

The contemporary church was built in 1904–1905, the construction work being financed by the military.

Architecture 

The church was built in the Neo-Russian style. It is a three-aisled masonry church, which on the plan forms an oblong rectangular with a polygonal apse and resembles a ship. The cathedral has ten towers with gilded cupolas. The interiors include murals and ceiling pieces.

It has been suggested that the icons on the oak iconostasis in the cathedral are copies of works by Viktor Vasnetsov in St. Vladimir's Cathedral, Kiev.

See also
List of large Orthodox cathedrals

Footnotes

References

Literature 

 

Daugavpils
Cathedrals in Latvia
Russian Orthodox cathedrals
Eastern Orthodox churches in Latvia
20th-century churches in Latvia
20th-century Eastern Orthodox church buildings